Festival of Darkness or Celebration of Darkness may refer to:
Samhain
Halloween
Wave-Gotik-Treffen